Hafström is a Swedish surname (not to be confused with the Swedish surname Håfström). Notable people with the surname include:

Gillis Hafström (1841–1909), Swedish painter
Jonas Hafström (born 1948), Swedish diplomat 

Swedish-language surnames